Szhirley Nova Beanca Rokahaim (born Shirley Haim on 23 September 1976) a Danish singer known as Szhirley. She is best known for her EMI Denmark English-language debut album I'm Coming (1996) which was a moderate success in Denmark, but a major success in Japan.

Discography
 I'm Coming (1996)
 Hjerter dame (2008)
 Timeglas (2016)

Featured in
 DR Big Band, The James Bond Classics (feat. Szhirley) (EMI/Red Dot, 2008)
 Alexander Brown, Sidste Gang (feat. Szhirley) (2012)

Theatre
Elsk Mig i Nat (2009-2012)
Shrek (2013)
Tam Tam revyen (2014-2015)
We Will Rock You (2017)

References

1976 births
Living people
Danish pop singers
21st-century Danish singers